Vyhoda (also Wygoda, Vigoda) is an urban-type settlement located in Kalush Raion in Ivano-Frankivsk Oblast, approximately 120 km from Lviv. Vyhoda became a town in 1940 and lies on the Svicha River. Vyhoda hosts the administration of Vyhoda settlement hromada, one of the hromadas of Ukraine. Population: .

History
Vyhoda's history started in the 19th century and was closely connected with the activity of Baron Leopold Popper von Podhragy. In 1873, Baron Leopold Popper von Podhragy opened a branch office in Pacykiv (a small village near Vyhoda, which since 1966 is a part of Vyhoda) after buying the domain Vyhoda, which consisted of approximately 35,000 hectares. At that time, the Popper's firm (at the time the company was the largest timber industry venture worldwide) specialized in logging, processing and sale of wood. In the 1880s, the Baron installed the first 18-gang sawmill in the area close to Vyhoda, many more sawmills followed. The Baron opened the first ever College of the Timber Industry in Vyhoda which was unique worldwide and the first in the Austro-Hungarian Empire. The Svicha river was used by Popper's firm as the way to transport wood from mountains to sawmill. However, this way of wood transport was not perfect since the river was often blocked by the wood flooding living area. That is why in 1883 the railroad was built by Baron Popper von Podhragy from the district center Dolyna to Vyhoda. This year (1883) is the official data of Vyhoda's founding. At the end of the 19th century, Vyhoda became to develop drastically, and in 1895 there were water and steam sawmills, the plant of wood frames of musical instruments, mill, and railway station. In 1897, the chemical plant specialized on wood alteration was built by German Peter Wergan.
The Vyhoda's inhabitants took part in the First and the Second World War.

Until 18 July 2020, Vyhoda belonged to Dolyna Raion. The raion was abolished in July 2020 as part of the administrative reform of Ukraine, which reduced the number of raions of Ivano-Frankivsk Oblast to six. The area of Dolyna Raion was merged into Kalush Raion.

Geography

Location
Vyhoda is located at the base of the Carpathian Mountains, approximately 120 km from Lviv and 70 km from Ivano-Frankivsk.

Climate
Vyhoda's climate is humid continental (Köppen climate classification Dfb). Average annual rainfall is 600 mm (26 inches) with the maximum being in summer. Cloud coverage averages 70 days per year.

Demographics

 2002: 2,278 inhabitants

The population of Vyhoda consists mainly of Ukrainians.

Transport
The public transportation is mainly represented by small buses and taxi. Large buses are not commonly used. The price of a one-way single ride in a taxi from Vyhoda to Dolyna (district center) is 2.5 UAH regardless of the distance traveled. No tickets are provided – and the money is paid to the driver. The connection between Vyhoda and near villages is provided by small buses which are going from district center Dolyna through Vyhoda. The price depends on distance, and in average is 4 UAH per 10 km. Also, the motorway Dolyna - Khust is going through Vyhoda, using which, one can reach Zakarpattia Oblast by buses or cars.

Religion

Vyhoda was a vibrant city of both Jews and Christians. There are two Christian churches, which represent two Christian groups: The Ukrainian Catholic and Orthodox.  The Jews who lived in Vyhoda prior to World War II were exterminated during the Holocaust.

Education
Vyhoda has one high school, one kindergarten and one music school. The music school was opened in 1970, as the small children school with few teachers. However, now it is a big school located on the corner of V. Tereshkova and Zavodska Str with about 200 students.

Sport
There is broad variety of sport activities in Vyhoda: light athletics, volleyball, basketball, tourism, etc. All sport activities are closely connected with high school. Mainly the teachers of the school's physical education are training the students.

Tourist attractions
 Carpathian tram

Gallery

References

Urban-type settlements in Kalush Raion